Bar Aftab-e Khorbel (also Romanized as Bar Āftāb-e Khorbel) is a village in Emamzadeh Jafar Rural District, in the Central District of Gachsaran County, Kohgiluyeh and Boyer-Ahmad Province, Iran.

References 

Populated places in Gachsaran County